Manfred Inger (1907–1984) was an Austrian stage, film and television actor.

Selected filmography
 Cordula (1950)
 The Magic Face (1951)
 No Time for Flowers (1952)
 Adventure in Vienna (1952)
 The House on the Coast (1954)
 The Bath in the Barn (1956)
 Arms and the Man (1958)

References

Bibliography 
 Greco, Joseph. The File on Robert Siodmak in Hollywood, 1941-1951. Universal-Publishers, 1999.

External links 
 

1907 births
1984 deaths
Austrian male television actors
Austrian male film actors
Austrian male stage actors
Male actors from Vienna